In Polynesian languages the word aitu refers to ghosts or spirits, often malevolent. The word is common to many languages of Western and Eastern Polynesia. In the mythology of Tonga, for example, aitu or eitu are lesser gods, many being patrons of specific villages and families.  They often take the form of plants or animals, and are often more cruel than other gods. These trouble-making gods are regarded as having come from Samoa. The Tongan word tangi lauaitu means to cry from grief, to lament.

In Māori mythology, the word aitu refers to sickness, calamity, or demons; the related word aituā means misfortune, accident, disaster. In Tahitian, aitu (syn. atua/raitu) can mean 'god' or 'spirit'; in other languages, including Rarotongan, Samoan, Sikaiana, Kapingamarangi, Takuu, Tuamotuan, and Niuean, aitu are ghosts or spirits.

In Cook Islands Aitu is also the name of ancient tribes who came from the east.

In the Samoa Islands, aitu also means ghost. In other Austronesian cultures, cognates of aitu include the Micronesian aniti, Bunun hanitu, Filipino and Tao anito, and Malaysian and Indonesian hantu or antu.

See also
Kupua
Nuku-mai-tore
Polynesian mythology
Taotao Mona
Tui Fiti

Notes

Tongan mythology
Māori mythology
Polynesian mythology
Māori words and phrases
Samoan words and phrases
Māori legendary creatures
Austronesian spirituality
Nature spirits